The Takutu River Bridge is a bridge across the Takutu River, linking Lethem in Guyana to Bonfim in Brazil.  It was completed in 2009 and opened on 31 July 2009. Its official inauguration was on 14 September 2009, in the presence of leaders of both countries. It cost US$5 million and was paid for by Brazil. The bridge was a project within the Initiative for the Integration of the Regional Infrastructure of South America.

The bridge is the only instance in the Americas of a land border where drivers must change from driving on the left (in Guyana) to driving on the right (in Brazil), or vice versa. The changeover is achieved by means of a crossover bridge on the Guyanese side.

See also
 List of bridges in Guyana

References

External links

http://www.lib.utexas.edu/maps/americas/guyana_rel_1991.pdf
Commentary: Guyana and Brazil - Bridging for good times - February 13, 2009 - Caribbean Net News

International bridges
Brazil–Guyana border crossings
Bridges in Brazil
Road bridges in Guyana
Bridges completed in 2009